Samuel McAdam Beswick (8 March 1903 – 15 December 1966) was a footballer who played as a centre forward for Stockport County, Tranmere Rovers and Rhyl.

References

1903 births
1966 deaths
Stockport County F.C. players
Tranmere Rovers F.C. players
Rhyl F.C. players
English footballers
Sportspeople from Macclesfield
Association football forwards